Sinyavino is the name of several inhabited localities in Russia.

Urban localities
Sinyavino, Leningrad Oblast, an urban-type settlement under the administrative jurisdiction of Sinyavinskoye Settlement Municipal Formation in Kirovsky District of Leningrad Oblast; 

Rural localities
Sinyavino, Yantarny, Kaliningrad Oblast, a settlement under the administrative jurisdiction of the urban-type settlement of oblast significance of Yantarny in Kaliningrad Oblast
Sinyavino, Gusevsky District, Kaliningrad Oblast, a settlement under the administrative jurisdiction of the town of district significance of Gusev in Gusevsky District of Kaliningrad Oblast
Sinyavino, Kaluga Oblast, a village in Medynsky District of Kaluga Oblast
Sinyavino, Tula Oblast, a selo in Prigorodny Rural Okrug of Plavsky District in Tula Oblast